The sooty eel (Bascanichthys bascanium) is an eel in the family Ophichthidae (worm/snake eels). It was described by David Starr Jordan in 1884, originally under the genus Caecula. It is a marine, subtropical eel which is known from the western Atlantic Ocean, including North Carolina and Florida, USA, and the Gulf of Mexico.

The sooty eel is preyed on by the Atlantic tripletail.

References

Ophichthidae
Fish described in 1884
Taxa named by David Starr Jordan